Houston Municipal Airport  is a public use airport in Chickasaw County, Mississippi, United States. It is owned by the City of Houston and located two nautical miles (4 km) southwest of its central business district. This airport is included in the National Plan of Integrated Airport Systems for 2011–2015, which categorized it as a general aviation facility.

Facilities and aircraft 
Houston Municipal Airport covers an area of 84 acres (34 ha) at an elevation of 337 feet (103 m) above mean sea level. It has one runway designated 3/21 with an asphalt surface measuring 4,400 by 75 feet (1,341 x 23 m).

For the 12-month period ending November 30, 2011, the airport had 15,200 aircraft operations, an average of 41 per day: 93% general aviation and 7% military. At that time there were 11 aircraft based at this airport: 91% single-engine and 9% ultralight.

See also 
 List of airports in Mississippi

References

External links 
 Aerial image as of March 1996 from USGS The National Map
 
 

Airports in Mississippi
Buildings and structures in Chickasaw County, Mississippi
Transportation in Chickasaw County, Mississippi